Johannes Scharf (1765–1794), was an Austrian painter and illustrator.

References

Botanical illustrators
1765 births
1794 deaths
Date of birth missing
Date of death missing